Fødselsstiftelsen, also referred to as Fødsels- og Plejestiftelsen (antiquated spelling: Fødsels- og Pleiestiftelsen; Literal translation: Maternity and Caring Institution), was a Danish maternity institution in Amaliegade in Copenhagen, Denmark.

The institution was created for women to give birth anonymously and receiving free medical care. The purpose was to avoid infanticide.  The woman was offered eternal anonymity, however this ruling was changed in 2007, and the archive is now accessible, mostly for genealogy purposes.

History

A primitive maternity house in Gothersgade was established by Frederick V in 1750. It was in 1759 moved to Frederiks Hospital. The Royal Maternity House was founded by Queen Juliane Marie on 9 April 1785 by moving it to a new building next to a new building next to the hospital. Its new building was the former home of the architect Lauritz de Thurah.

Fødselsstiftelsen was part of Rigshospitalet from 1910. It gradually developed into a department for complicated births. In 1994, it became part of Rigshospitalet's Juliane Marie Center.

See also
 Carl Edvard Marius Levy

References

External links
 Fødselsstiftelsensen's archives at the National Archives of Denmark
 Source
 Source

1785 establishments in Denmark
Hospitals established in the 1780s
Listed buildings and structures in Copenhagen
Defunct hospitals in Copenhagen
Maternity hospitals
Women's organizations based in Denmark
Maternity in Denmark